The 1984 United States House of Representatives elections in Alabama were held on November 6, 1984, to determine who would represent Alabama in the United States House of Representatives. Alabama had seven seats in the House, apportioned according to the 1980 United States Census. Representatives are elected for two-year terms.

Overview

District 1

District 2

District 3

District 4

District 5

District 6

District 7

See also
 1984 United States House of Representatives elections

References

Alabama
1984
United States House of Representatives